Latty is an unincorporated community in Washington County, in the U.S. state of Missouri. The community is on Missouri Route 185 approximately 4.5 miles northwest of Potosi.

History
A post office called Latty was established in 1894, and remained in operation until 1919. The community has the name of Latty Higginbotham, a woman in the neighborhood.

References

Unincorporated communities in Washington County, Missouri
Unincorporated communities in Missouri